Chonala is a genus of butterflies of the family Nymphalidae found in eastern Asia.

Species
Listed alphabetically:
 Chonala episcopalis
 Chonala laurae
 Chonala masoni
 Chonala miyatai
 Chonala praeusta

References

External links
Images representing Chonala at Consortium for the Barcode of Life

Satyrini
Nymphalidae genera
Taxa named by Frederic Moore